Robert Tillman Hampton was a politician in the state of Georgia.

Hampton was a member of the Georgia House of Representatives for Fannin County (1931, 1935, 1937-37/38 Ex., 1945,45 Ex.-46, 1947).

Hampton was the parent of Hayden Wilburn Hampton, another member of the Georgia House of Representatives and of the Georgia State Senate.

Personal life
Hampton married Alice Cordelia Lefevers on 1894 December 30.

References

Members of the Georgia House of Representatives
1870 births
1956 deaths
People from Union County, Georgia